The following is a list of Djiboutian politicians, both past and present.



A
 Abdi, Ahmed Ibrahim
 Abdou, Mohamed Bolock
 Ahmed, Ahmed Dini
 Ali, Idriss Arnaoud
 Ali, Mohamed Moussa
 Ali, Souleiman Miyir

B
 Bourhan, Ali Aref

C
 Chehem, Mohamed Moussa

D
 Daoud, Ali Mohamed
 Daoud, Ibrahim Chehem
 Dato, Hasna Mohamed
 Dileïta, Dileïta Mohamed

E
 Elabé, Mohamed Djama

F
 Farah, Ali Abdi
 Farah, Moumin Bahdon
 Farah, Mahamoud Harbi

G
 Gouled Aptidon, Hassan
 Guelleh, Ismaïl Omar
 Ali, Helaf Orbis
 Hamadou, Barkat Gourad
 Hamariteh, Abdillahi
 Hassan, Ahmed Mohamed

I
 Helaf Orbis Ali, former ministere of the defence, justice, labor, civil service, agriculture from 1974 to 1994

K
 Kamil, Abdallah Mohamed

M
 Mohamed, Mohamed Abdoulkader

R
 Awaleh, Aden Robleh

Y
 Youssouf, Ahmed Aden
 Youssouf, Mahamoud Ali

 
Lists of Djiboutian people
Djibouti